Justice Livermore may refer to:

Arthur Livermore, associate justice and chief justice of the Superior Court of New Hampshire
Samuel Livermore, chief justice of the New Hampshire Superior Court